The Noose is a Singapore comedy TV series produced by MediaCorp Channel 5. The Noose is a parody of Singaporean news programmes with fictional news reports and a presentation mimicking that of the actual news bulletin.

A total of 101 episodes were broadcast over six seasons, with the season 6 finale airing on  October 30 2016.

Series overview

Episodes

Season 1 (2007)

Season 2 (2008)

Season 3 (2010)

Season 4 (2011)

Season 5 (2011-12)

Season 6 (2013)

References

Noose